Urgleptes borikensis is a species of beetle in the family Cerambycidae. It was described by Micheli and Micheli in 2004.

References

Urgleptes
Beetles described in 2004